Ultimate Band is a music video game for the Nintendo DS & Wii. It is developed by Fall Line Studios, and published by Disney Interactive Studios.

Gameplay
Ultimate Band allows players to play guitar, drums, bass or be the front man or woman in a band (though vocals are not supported). The Wii version follows the fortunes of an upstart rock band, with the player building the career of their customizable character, unlocking bonus songs, venues and accessories.

Ultimate Band forgoes the use of specialized peripherals such as guitar and drum controllers, relying mainly on the Wii Remote and Nunchuk for the Wii version, and the touch screen and stylus for the DS version. For example, to play notes on guitar in the Wii version the player must press a button combination on the Nunchuk while strumming the Wii Remote up and down. The DS version, based on Hannah Montana: Music Jam's code base, will also allow players to create and record their own songs, and have greater song customization options.

Ultimate Band features support for Disney Interactive's DGamer community network. The game will also feature connectivity between the Wii and DS versions, with DS players being able to control stage lighting and effects using the touch screen while a band performs on the Wii.

Soundtrack
The Wii version of game features over 30 songs which comprise "a broad selection of current hits and all-time rock favorites" by "some of the biggest names in rock, alternative, popular, emo, and indie rock music". The DS version only contains 15 songs, 12 from the Wii soundtrack and 3 exclusive to the DS.

All songs are cover versions in order to better tweak the music to fit with the game, to self-censor explicit lyrics, and to allow both male and female vocalists.

Reception

1UP.com gave the game a D grade, believing the Remote-based controls felt "disconnected" and that the soundtrack was "anemic", with "generic, sometimes embarrassing vocalists". GameSpot was more positive, scoring it a 6.0/10 and praising the game's family-friendly presentation and use of both male and female vocals being recorded for each song, yet were less impressed by its "finicky" controls and unreliable gesture recognition.

See also
Guitar Hero World Tour
Rock Band
Rock Revolution

References

External links
 Ultimate Band at IGN

2008 video games
Music video games
Guitar video games
Nintendo Wi-Fi Connection games
Wii Wi-Fi games
Disney video games
Video games developed in the United States
Games with Wii-DS connectivity
Multiplayer and single-player video games